Carl Menke (born 3 July 1906; date of death unknown) was a German field hockey player who competed in the 1936 Summer Olympics.

He was a member of the German field hockey team, which won the silver medal. He played one match as halfback.

External links
 
Profile of Carl Menke

1906 births
German male field hockey players
Field hockey players at the 1936 Summer Olympics
Olympic field hockey players of Germany
Olympic silver medalists for Germany
Year of death unknown
Medalists at the 1936 Summer Olympics